Reshard Cliett (born April 29, 1992) is a gridiron football linebacker for the Montreal Alouettes of the Canadian Football League (CFL). He played college football at South Florida. He was drafted by the Houston Texans in the sixth round (211th overall) of the 2015 NFL Draft.

High school career
Cliett attended Thomas County Central High School in Thomasville, Georgia. While there, he was recorded running a 4.5 40-yard dash. He suffered a knee injury and missed his entire junior season. The next season, as a senior safety, he recorded 97 tackles and four interceptions. He received offers from South Florida, Georgia Southern, Eastern Kentucky and South Alabama.

College career
Cliett selected to attend South Florida where he majored in interdisciplinary social science. As a freshman in 2010, he was redshirted and didn't appear in a game until the next season. In 2011, he appeared in nine game, both on defense and special teams. He recorded five tackles, 1.5 tackles-for-loss, a sack and one pass break up. In 2012, he appeared in 11 games, starting six at linebacker and he also played special teams. He recorded 40 tackles, two for-losses, a sack, three passes broken up and a fumble recovery. In 2013, he appeared in 11 games, starting 10. He recorded 56 tackles, seven for-losses, three pass break-ups and one sack. In 2014, he was named a team captain. For the season, he recorded 38 tackles, 7.5 for-losses and a team-leading six sacks.

For his college career, he recorded 134 total tackles, 16 for-losses, seven sacks, seven pass-break ups and two fumble recoveries.

Professional career
During his pro-day work out, Cliett recorded a 4.4 and 4.5 second 40-yard dash. He also recorded a 38 1/2" vertical leap, a 10-foot 4 inch broad jump, a 4.53 second short shuttle, a 7.2 second 3-cone drill. He also recorded 21 reps of 225 pounds, and weighed in at 235 lbs.

Houston Texans
Cliett was selected in the sixth round (211th overall) of the 2015 NFL draft by the Houston Texans. He signed his rookie contract on May 8, 2015. He was placed on injured reserve with a knee injury on September 1, 2015.

On September 3, 2016, Cliett was released by the Texans.

Denver Broncos
On September 13, 2016, Cliett was signed to the Broncos' practice squad. He was released on October 18, 2016.

New York Jets
On October 26, 2016, Cliett was signed to the Jets' practice squad. He was released by the Jets on November 1, 2016.

Arizona Cardinals
On November 22, 2016 Cliett was signed to the Cardinals' practice squad. He was released on December 6, 2016 but was re-signed on December 13, 2016.

Tennessee Titans
On January 3, 2017, Cliett signed a reserve/future contract with the Titans. On May 15, 2017, he was waived by the Titans.

Kansas City Chiefs
On May 16, 2017, Cliett was claimed off waivers by the Kansas City Chiefs. He was waived/injured on August 6, 2017 and placed on injured reserve. He was released on August 12, 2017.

Minnesota Vikings
On March 29, 2018, Cliett signed with the Minnesota Vikings. He was waived on September 1, 2018 and was signed to the practice squad the next day. He signed a reserve/future contract with the Vikings on January 2, 2019.

On August 31, 2019, Cliett was waived by the Vikings. He was re-signed to the practice squad on December 3, 2019. His practice squad contract with the team expired on January 20, 2020.

Dallas Renegades
On October 16, 2019, Cliett was selected in the 2020 XFL Draft by the Dallas Renegades. He signed a contract with the team on January 18, 2020. He had his contract terminated when the league suspended operations on April 10, 2020.

Toronto Argonauts
On February 15, 2021, Cliett signed with the Toronto Argonauts of the Canadian Football League (CFL). He spent most of the season on the practice roster and played in one regular season game before being released on October 18, 2021.

Montreal Alouettes
Cliett signed with the Montreal Alouettes on October 20, 2021 and played in one regular season game for the team in 2021.

References

External links
 
 Houston Texans bio

1992 births
Living people
Players of American football from Georgia (U.S. state)
People from Thomasville, Georgia
American football linebackers
South Florida Bulls football players
Houston Texans players
Denver Broncos players
New York Jets players
Arizona Cardinals players
Tennessee Titans players
Kansas City Chiefs players
Minnesota Vikings players
Dallas Renegades players
Toronto Argonauts players
Montreal Alouettes players